The 1996 Atlantic 10 men's basketball tournament was played from March 6 to March 9, 1996. The tournament was played at the Philadelphia Civic Center in Philadelphia, Pennsylvania.  The winner was named champion of the Atlantic 10 Conference and received an automatic bid to the 1996 NCAA Men's Division I Basketball Tournament. The University of Massachusetts won the tournament for the fifth year in a row. Massachusetts eventually reached the semifinals of the NCAA tournament. George Washington, Temple, and Virginia Tech also received bids to the tournament. Carmelo Travieso of Massachusetts was named the tournament's Most Outstanding Player. Future NBA players Marcus Camby (Massachusetts), Marc Jackson (Temple), and Tyson Wheeler (Rhode Island) were among those also named to the All-Championship Team.  The top two teams in each division received a first-round bye.

Bracket

All games played at Philadelphia Civic Center, Philadelphia, Pennsylvania* - Overtime

Atlantic 10 men's basketball tournament
Tournament
Atlantic 10 men's basketball tournament
Atlantic 10 men's basketball tournament